Shahrak-e Aliabad may refer to:
 Shahrak-e Aliabad, Fars
 Shahrak-e Aliabad, Hormozgan
 Shahrak-e Aliabad, Lorestan